Nicole Pulliam is an American actress.

Early life
Pulliam, born and raised in Columbus, Ohio, always wanted to be an actress.

Filmography

Film

Television

External links

Living people
American film actresses
American television actresses
Actresses from Columbus, Ohio
Year of birth missing (living people)
21st-century American women